Yazdan Yazdanpanah is an Iranian born infectiologist who is head of the Infectious Disease department at Bichat–Claude Bernard Hospital. He was Professor of Medicine at Paris Diderot University.

He became an MD from the Lille School of Medicine in 1996, obtained a Master of Science in epidemiology from the Harvard School of Public Health in 2000, and completed a PhD in public
health from the Bordeaux School of Public Health in 2002.

He has an h-index of 64 according to Semantic Scholar.

References

1965 births
Living people
Harvard School of Public Health alumni
Academic staff of Paris Diderot University
21st-century Iranian physicians